Coelogyne suaveolens is a species of orchid.

suaveolens